Cape Naturaliste College is a comprehensive public co-educational high day school, located in Vasse, a regional centre in the South West region,  south of Perth, Western Australia.

Overview 
The school was established in 2008 and admitted 95 foundation Year 8 students in February of that year. The Minister of Education, Mark McGowan, announced later the same year that the school would become a senior high school and enrol students for Year 11 courses in 2011 and Year 12 in 2012.

Enrolments at the school have increased from the initial 95 students in 2008, to 224 in 2009 when Year 9 commenced, to 282 when Year 10 was introduced, and to 355 in 2011 when the school introduced Year 11 classes. In 2012 the Year 12 cohort was introduced and enrolments increased to 446 students. In 2015 the school introduced a cohort of Year 7 students.

The college is built on an  site and is surrounded by natural bushland. It is of an award-winning design and was constructed at an initial cost of $21 million. However, in 2019–20 over $32 million was spent to upgrade the Science, English, and arts departments (among others).

The school has a multi-media centre, a performing arts centre, visual arts studios, information technology resources, a music program and a cafe.

See also
 
List of schools in rural Western Australia

References

External links
 Cape Naturaliste College website

South West (Western Australia)
Busselton
Public high schools in Western Australia
Educational institutions established in 2008
2008 establishments in Australia